Crumbling the Antiseptic Beauty is the debut album by the English rock band Felt. Recorded in 1981, it was released in February 1982 by Cherry Red Records. Band leader Lawrence features on the cover.

The opening track "Evergreen Dazed" is instrumental. The second track "Fortune" was later re-recorded and released on the band's 1984 single Sunlight Bathed the Golden Glow.  Similarly, a re-recording of "Cathedral" appears on the Primitive Painters single.

Critical reception

In an AllMusic album review, critic Tim Sendra rated Crumbling the Antiseptic Beauty with three-and-a-half out five stars noting its "New York City scene of the '70s and the gloomy psychedelia of the '60s" influences, and overall describing it as "skeletal and mysterious". In 2013, the album was ranked at number 34 on Fact magazine's list of The 100 Best Albums of The 1980s.

Track listing
All words by Lawrence. The music by Lawrence and Maurice Deebank.

Personnel
Felt

 Lawrence – vocals, guitar, bass guitar on "I Worship the Sun"
 Maurice Deebank – electric guitar, bass guitar on "Birdmen" and "Templeroy"
 Nick Gilbert – bass guitar on "Fortune" and "Cathedral"
 Gary Ainge – drums

References 

Felt (band) albums
1982 debut albums
Cherry Red Records albums
Albums produced by John A. Rivers